Berg is a former municipality that was located in the old Troms county, Norway.  The municipality existed from 1838 until its dissolution in 2020 when it was merged into the new Senja Municipality. The administrative centre of the municipality was the village of Skaland.  Other villages included Finnsæter, Mefjordvær, and Senjahopen.  The municipality is located on the western part of the large island of Senja.

At the time of its dissolution as a municipality on 1 January 2020, the  municipality was the 281st largest by area out of the 422 municipalities in Norway. Berg was also the 406th most populous municipality in Norway with a population of 902.

The municipality was the first place in the world to utilize a hydroelectrical power station in the mining community of Hamn. When the mining industry ceased, the "electrical adventure" did as well. The buildings are still located at Hamn, now functioning as a special hotel/lodge.

The first female pastor in the Lutheran Church of Norway, Ingrid Bjerkås, worked in this parish, starting in 1961.

General information

Berg was established as a municipality on 1 January 1838 (see formannskapsdistrikt).  The southern part of Berg (population: 1,229) was separated from Berg to form the new Torsken Municipality on 1 January 1902.  This left Berg with 1,002 residents.  The municipal borders have not changed since.

In March 2017, the Parliament of Norway voted to merge the municipalities of Berg, Torsken, Lenvik, and Tranøy.  The new municipality will encompass the whole island of Senja plus part of the mainland.  The new Senja Municipality will be established on 1 January 2020.

Name
The municipality (originally the parish) is named after the old Berg farm (Old Norse: Bærg) in what is now the village of Skaland. The farm is where Berg Church is located. The name is identical with the word berg which means "mountain".

Coat of arms
The coat of arms was granted on 2 October 1987. The official blazon is "Per bend sinister double bevilled argent and sable". This means the arms have a double bevilled division of the field running along a diagonal path (bend sinister). The field (background) below the line has a tincture of sable. The field above the line has a tincture of argent which means it is commonly colored white, but if it is made out of metal, then silver is used. The arms are canting since "berg" means "mountain" in Norwegian and the arms show the profile of the three mountains of Trælen, Oksen, and Kjølva. The colors represent "winter darkness", "black sea", and "toward brighter times." The arms were designed by Rolf Tidemann.

Churches
The Church of Norway has one parish (sokn) within the municipality of Berg.  It is part of the Senja prosti (deanery) in the Diocese of Nord-Hålogaland.

Geography

The municipality faces the Atlantic Ocean on the west side of the large island of Senja.  The largest urban area in Berg is the village of Senjahopen. The highest point on the island, the mountain Breidtinden, is located in the northeastern part of Berg.  There are three large fjords that cut into the municipality: Bergsfjorden, Ersfjorden, and Mefjorden.

Climate

Government
Berg municipality (while it existed) was responsible for primary education (through 10th grade), outpatient health services, senior citizen services, unemployment and other social services, zoning, economic development, and municipal roads. The municipality was governed by a municipal council of elected representatives, which in turn elected a mayor.  The municipality fell under the Senja District Court and the Hålogaland Court of Appeal.

Municipal council
The municipal council  of Berg was made up of 15 representatives that were elected to four year terms.  The party breakdown of the final municipal council was as follows:

See also
List of former municipalities of Norway

References

External links

 

 
Former municipalities of Norway
1838 establishments in Norway
2020 disestablishments in Norway
Populated places disestablished in 2020